Kalgadarreh-ye Do (also Romanized as Kalgadarreh-ye Do; also known as Kalak Darreh and Kalakdarreh-ye Do) is a village in Qilab Rural District, Alvar-e Garmsiri District, Andimeshk County, Khuzestan Province, Iran. At the 2006 census, its population was 625, in 119 families.

References 

Populated places in Andimeshk County